The Royal Brighton Yacht Club (founded in 1875) is located at Brighton, Victoria, Australia at 253 Esplanade Brighton.

History 

It is said to have all begun as a result of a chance race challenge between two gentlemen cleaning their boats on the beach at Middle Brighton in August 1875. One month later, the Brighton Sailing Club was established with fifteen members. By April 1876 the Club (now Brighton Yacht Club) had fifty-seven members and thirteen boats on the register. In 1877 the first building was erected on the site. The Club prospered despite the depression of the 1890s, and by the turn of the century was in a sound financial position with 167 members and a new clubhouse, opened in 1898. So popular was the Club that a branch was opened at Black Rock in 1903, later to become Black Rock Yacht Club.

Keenly competitive, those early members enjoyed spirited Club racing and soon turned to inter-club and inter-colonial competition. At the second inter-club regatta in 1878, thirty-four entries from four clubs vied for prize money in excess of £70. The regatta was a great success, attracting spectators from all parts of the city, and was to establish the Club’s reputation of excellence in race management that continues today. Then, as now, the Club’s facilities had constantly to be expanded, upgraded, rebuilt and refurbished. The pier was first extended in 1904, and a slipway built in 1907. The clubhouse required enlargement in that year also, perhaps to provide elbowroom necessitated by the newly obtained liquor licence!

Extra moorings behind the extension to the breakwater brought new members, and gave new impetus to the Club, a fact not lost on other clubs in Port Phillip Bay. In 1925 another extension to the clubhouse was completed. The Royal Warrant was granted in 1924 by His Majesty King George V. The Club had long had vice-regal connections – Lord Brassey, Governor of Victoria, was elected to membership in 1896, and Lord Forster, Governor-General, was elected in 1921. Both the then Governor-General and Governor of Victoria, Lord Stonehaven and the Earl of Stradbroke, were elected to membership in 1926.

The Club’s association with the Royal Australian Navy was so strong in the early years of this century that the suggestion was made to the Club that it should form a section of the RAN Reserve. Many senior naval officers have been active in the club; the tradition continues today. The storm of 1933 which destroyed the pier and three-quarters of the fleet was a turning point in the history of Royal Brighton Yacht Club. The loss of so many boats hastened the advent of one-design class racing, in which the Club has been successful for more than sixty years. The Club’s support of junior sailing and one-design class racing produced many champions, some of whom have competed at the highest levels.

The resurgence of interest in yachting spurred by the international competition of the America’s Cup challenge of the 1960s required expanded facilities. The marina was completed in the late 1960s and was further extended in 1979. The addition of the hardstand in 1987 accommodated a large one-design fleet, still flourishing today. From the chance meeting of two boat owners on the beach, and the vision of successive generations of members, the Club continues to grow and prosper and will be celebrating 150 years in 2025 . Its spirit of friendly competition and tradition of sailing excellence endures, and the values and traditions developed through its history will preserve it and carry it forward to meet the challenges of the future.

Prominent members 

John Bertrand - Skipper of the victorious Australia II in the 1983 America's Cup
Mark Turnbull - Australian Gold Medalist in the Sydney 2000 Olympics (Double-Handed Dinghy 470 class)
Sarah Blanck - Represented Australia in the Athens Olympics in 2004 in the Europe Dinghy one class design
Some of the Brighton Icebergers are members of the Brighton Yacht club.

Regattas 
In December 2019, the Royal Brighton Yacht Club held the Finn (dinghy) class Gold Cup.

References

External links
 

Royal yacht clubs
Yacht clubs in Victoria (Australia)
Sporting clubs in Melbourne
Brighton Yacht Club, Royal
1875 establishments in Australia
Sports clubs established in 1875
Sport in the City of Bayside
Buildings and structures in the City of Bayside